Mark Holmes Slocum is a United States Air Force major general who serves as the cirector of global operations of the U.S. Air Force. He previously served as the director of air and space operations of the Air Combat Command.

Military career 

In May 2022, Slocum's reassignment as director of global operations of the U.S. Air Force was announced.

References

External links

Living people
Year of birth missing (living people)
Place of birth missing (living people)
United States Air Force generals